Wiqu (Aymara for a corner in a house, a mountain cove, Quechua for twisted, bent, hispanicized spellings Huecco, Hueco, Huejo, Veco) may refer to:

 Wiqu (Cusco-Puno), a mountain on the border of the Cusco Region and the Puno Region, Peru
 Wiqu (Lima), a mountain in the Lima Region, Peru
 Wiqu (Puno), a mountain in the Puno Region, Peru
 Wiqu (Tacna), a mountain in the Tacna Region, Peru